Ángel Gerardo Islas Maldonado (9 September 1983 – 2 February 2023) was a Mexican politician. A member of the New Alliance Party and later the Force for Mexico, he served in the Congress of Puebla from 2018 to 2021.

Islas died of a heart attack in Madrid on 2 February 2023, at the age of 39.

References

1983 births
2023 deaths
21st-century Mexican businesspeople
21st-century Mexican politicians
Members of the Congress of Puebla
New Alliance Party (Mexico) politicians
People from Puebla (city)